Abhishek Thakuri (born 31 October 1998) is an Indian cricketer. He made his first-class debut for Assam in the 2017–18 Ranji Trophy on 25 November 2017. He made his List A debut for Assam in the 2017–18 Vijay Hazare Trophy on 8 February 2018. He made his Twenty20 debut on 10 January 2021, for Assam in the 2020–21 Syed Mushtaq Ali Trophy.

References

External links
 

1998 births
Living people
Indian cricketers
Assam cricketers